Anthony Karl Gregory (born 6 July 1967) is a retired Icelandic football striker.

International career
Gregory was born in Iceland to an African-American father and Icelandic mother. He made his debut for Iceland in an August 1990 friendly match away against the Faroe Islands, in which he scored two goals, and has earned a total of 5 caps, scoring 2 goals. His final international was a May 1991 European Championship qualification match against Albania.

References

External links

1966 births
Living people
Association football forwards
Anthony Karl Gregory
Anthony Karl Gregory
Anthony Karl Gregory
Anthony Karl Gregory
Anthony Karl Gregory
FK Bodø/Glimt players
Anthony Karl Gregory
Anthony Karl Gregory
Úrvalsdeild karla (football) players
Eliteserien players
2. deild karla players
Anthony Karl Gregory
Expatriate footballers in Norway
Anthony Karl Gregory
Anthony Karl Gregory